The 2018 Oxford City Council election took place on 3 May 2018, to elect 24 of the 48 members of Oxford City Council in England. This was on the same day as other local elections in England. Each of Oxford's 24 wards elected one councillor, with the other seat in each ward next due for election in May 2020.

The Labour Party sought to defend its majority on the council, which it had controlled since 2008. Key issues in the election campaign included affordable housing, homelessness and air pollution. The results saw Labour gain two seats from the Green Party while losing one to the Liberal Democrats. This left Labour with 36 seats, the Liberal Democrats with 9 and the Greens with 2.

Background
Before the election, the Labour Party held a majority of seats on Oxford City Council. When the 24 seats up for election in 2018 were contested at the 2014 Oxford City Council election, 17 were won by Labour, 4 by the Liberal Democrats, and 3 by the Green Party of England and Wales. The 2016 election, at which the council's other 24 seats were contested, saw a stronger result for Labour (18 seats won) and weaker for the Greens (1 seat).

The 2018 election was the first regular election to Oxford City Council since the 2016 United Kingdom European Union membership referendum, at which Oxford defied a UK-wide vote to leave the European Union by returning a 70% vote to remain. A year after the referendum, in the 2017 UK general election, Labour significantly increased its majority in the parliamentary constituency of Oxford East (which includes most of the city of Oxford), while the Liberal Democrats gained Oxford West and Abingdon from the Conservative Party.

New Statesman commentator Stephen Bush suggested in March 2018 that a successful result for Labour in the 2018 Oxford City Council election, building on its strong parliamentary performance in 2017, would be to win all the available Green seats. The Oxford Mail'''s political correspondent Nathan Briant predicted, "Labour are likely to return a healthy number of councillors", but identified potential difficulties for the party: a rise in homelessness in Oxford as in other cities, controversy of the council's use of community protection notices to threaten to fine homeless people, and a perception of the national Labour leadership as too eurosceptic.

Stephen Bush argued that if the Liberal Democrats' national strategy of appealing to pro-European voters succeeded, one benchmark for this would be an expansion from eight seats on Oxford City Council to double figures.

Policies and campaigns
Conservative
The Oxford Conservative Association's chair Mark Bhagwandin criticised the Labour administration for a lack of affordable housing in Oxford, including at the recent Barton development. He stated he was confident that the Conservatives could improve on their previously weak position in Oxford, and that they would hold Labour to account. The party pledged to freeze the salaries of senior council staff, which Bhagwandin described as "huge".

Green
The Green Party's campaign also emphasised a need for scrutiny and opposition; co-leader Caroline Lucas stated while campaigning in Oxford that "one more Labour councillor won't make any difference", while "one more Green councillor" would ensure the council was "forced to deliver". Lucas identified homelessness as the issue on which Oxford's Green councillors been most active, and the Greens' manifesto highlighted their past campaigns for the council to provide additional homeless shelters and consider the use of rent controls, as well as their role in challenging fines for rough sleepers and removal of their property. Green policies also included addressing air pollution in St. Clement's by extending the council's proposed zero-emission zone, and redesignating the entire development on the Lucy Faithfull House site for affordable housing (instead of half as proposed by the council).

Labour
Oxford's governing Labour Party pledged in its manifesto, subtitled Fighting Austerity for a Fairer City, to build 1000 affordable homes and work with adjacent councils on "high quality urban extensions that will increase the availability of affordable homes". The Leader of the council, Susan Brown, advocated more development in the Oxford Green Belt to meet the city's housing needs. Emphasising Oxford's "strong cycling tradition", the manifesto included policies to provide more lanes and parking for cyclists, while supporting cycle hire businesses. On homelessness, Labour pledged increased spending and cooperation with charitable and voluntary organisations "with the objective of ensuring that no-one has to sleep rough in Oxford". Other "key pledges" included promotion of an Oxford living wage, support for sports clubs and facilities, and measures to reduce the city's carbon footprint and air pollution.

Launching the manifesto, Susan Brown and Shadow Secretary of State for Housing John Healey attacked the central government's austerity programme as responsible for homelessness and other social problems in Oxford and elsewhere, while Healey praised Oxford City Council's track record under its Labour administration. The Guardian journalist and Labour activist Owen Jones canvassed for the party's candidate Rabyah Khan in Summertown.

Liberal Democrat
Liberal Democrat leader Vince Cable highlighted the issues of homelessness and unaffordable housing during a visit to Oxford, while the party's Oxford West and Abingdon MP Layla Moran argued that Labour was over-dominant on the council and that additional Lib Dem councillors would provide improved scrutiny. The party's manifesto included pledges to re-examine potential sites in Oxford in order to build "hundreds more houses", with their councillors suggesting that land designated for business development could be reallocated for housing. The Lib Dems supported a review of the Green Belt for new sites for development, with safeguards for "areas of natural, historic, or scientific interest". They proposed increased accommodation and support for homeless people, while opposing fining of rough sleepers. Other pledges included a tourism tax as a source of revenue for public works. The Lib Dem leader on the council, Andrew Gant, suggested that some voters would support the party because of opposition to Brexit.

Candidates
The Labour and Conservative parties nominated candidates for all 24 seats, while the Greens contested 23 and the Liberal Democrats 21. The current Leader of the council, Susan Brown (Labour), stood for re-election in Churchill ward. David Thomas, the leader of the council's Green group who was previously elected in Holywell, contested St. Clement's against the Labour incumbent Tom Hayes.

Some councillors whose terms ended in 2018 did not seek re-election, including former Leader Bob Price (Labour, Hinksey Park) and Lord Mayor Jean Fooks (Liberal Democrat, Summertown).

 Results 
Labour increased its majority on the council, holding 36 of 48 seats after the election. The Greens, in what the Oxford Mail'' described as "an awful night" for the party, saw two of their three seats up for election won by Labour, while their leader David Thomas lost his place on the Council when his attempt to win St Clement's from Labour failed. This left the party with just two councillors. The Liberal Democrats won Quarry and Risinghurst from Labour, which was Labour's first loss of a seat in Oxford since 2006.

The highest turnout was 54.9% for Iffley Fields, and the lowest 19.9% for Northfield Brook.

Note: no UKIP candidates stood in this election, compared with two in 2016 and six in 2014. Two independent candidates were standing, compared with three in 2016 and four in 2014. Plus/minus percentages are calculated with respect to the 2016 Oxford City Council election. In addition to the 2 seats that Labour gained relative to the 2016 election, Labour also took back a seat they previously held that had become vacant in November 2017 (see Northfield Brook).

Total number of seats on the council after the election:

Results by ward
Ward results are taken from the Oxford City Council website. Results are described as holds or gains based on comparison with the 2014 election.

Barton and Sandhills

Blackbird Leys

Carfax

Churchill

Cowley

Cowley Marsh

Headington

Headington Hill and Northway

Hinksey Park

Holywell

Iffley Fields

Jericho and Osney

Littlemore

Lye Valley

Marston

North

Northfield Brook

The Northfield Brook seat contested at this election had been won by Labour in 2014. It was vacant between the death of Councillor Jennifer Pegg in November 2017 and the May 2018 election.

Quarry and Risinghurst

Rose Hill and Iffley

St. Clement's

St. Margaret's

St. Mary's

Summertown

Wolvercote

Notes

References

2018 English local elections
2018
2010s in Oxford